Gerardus Bernardus Maria "Gerd" Leers  (born 12 July 1951) is a Dutch politician of the Christian Democratic Appeal (CDA) party. He is the acting Mayor of Brunssum since 1 January 2018.

Biography

Politics
On 4 September 1990 Leers became a Member of the House of Representatives. He was a member of the permanent parliamentary commission for transport and water management. The political peak in his House of Representatives period was the Betuwe route, of which Leers was a strong proponent. However, he was also involved in a construction fraud scandal.

Leers became Mayor of Maastricht on 1 February 2002 after Karl Dittrich withdrew his candidacy. In 2008, he stood for mayor of The Hague and of Rotterdam. As mayor Leers took strict measures, such as the raid on the travellers camp Vinkenslag and stopping the subsidy to the football club MVV. He also was against amnesty for failed asylum seekers. In late 2004 Leers was chosen as best mayor of the Netherlands. This choice came after a conflict with the civil service, after heavy criticism from Leers.

Leers also gained attention for his attitude with respect to the policy on soft drugs. He criticised the tolerance policy that permits consumption and sale of marihuana and hashish, but prohibits its growing. Leers argued for legal production under government supervision, which would supposedly improve quality and therefore the public health . Leers also proposed the construction of a "weed boulevard" on the south side of Maastricht, so that drugs tourists would no longer cause trouble in the city centre. However, this proposal was rejected.

In January 2010, he resigned from office after an affair concerning a holiday villa project in Byala, Bulgaria. It was alleged that he was involved in shady deals to raise the value of villas he had ownership of.

On 14 October 2010 he became the new Minister for Immigration and Asylum Affairs in the first Rutte cabinet.

Decorations

References

External links

Official
  Drs. G.B.M. (Gerd) Leers Parlement & Politiek

1951 births
Living people
Catholic People's Party politicians
Christian Democratic Appeal politicians
Dutch accountants
Dutch management consultants
Dutch Roman Catholics
Mayors in Limburg (Netherlands)
People from Brunssum
Mayors of Maastricht
Members of the House of Representatives (Netherlands)
Ministers without portfolio of the Netherlands
Municipal councillors in North Brabant
Officers of the Order of Orange-Nassau
People from Kerkrade
Politicians from Maastricht
Radboud University Nijmegen alumni
University of Central Missouri alumni
20th-century Dutch civil servants
20th-century Dutch politicians
21st-century Dutch politicians